The men's mass start race of the 2015–16 ISU Speed Skating World Cup 3, arranged in Eisstadion Inzell, in Inzell, Germany, was held on 6 December 2015.

Alexis Contin of France won the race, while Jorrit Bergsma of the Netherlands came second, and Fabio Francolini of Italy came third. Lee Seung-hoon of South Korea won the Division B race.

Results

The race took place on Sunday, 6 December, with Division A scheduled in the afternoon session, at 17:17, and Division B scheduled in the evening session, at 18:39.

Division A

Division B

References

Men mass start
3